Madascincus nanus is a species of skink endemic to Madagascar.

References

Reptiles of Madagascar
Reptiles described in 2002
Taxa named by Franco Andreone
Taxa named by Allen Eddy Greer
Madascincus